Buxton Crescent is a Grade-I-listed building in the town of Buxton, Derbyshire, England. It owes much to the Royal Crescent in Bath, but has been described by the Royal Institution of British Architects as "more richly decorated and altogether more complex". It was designed by the architect John Carr of York, and built for the 5th Duke of Devonshire between 1780 and 1789. In 2020, following a multi-year restoration and redevelopment project supported by the National Heritage Memorial Fund and Derbyshire County Council, The Crescent was reopened as a 5-star spa hotel.

Setting

The Crescent faces the site of St Ann's Well, where warm spring water has flowed for thousands of years. The well is at the foot of The Slopes, a steep landscaped hillside in the centre of Buxton. Here the geological strata channel mineral water from a mile below ground, to emerge at a constant .

Originally detached, the Crescent is now the centrepiece of an attached range of significant Georgian architecture facing The Slopes, flanked on either side by the Grade-II-listed Buxton Baths, built by architect Henry Currey. To the west are the Natural Mineral Baths, built 1851–53; to the east are the Buxton Thermal Baths, built 1852–53. The Thermal Baths, closed in 1963 and at risk of demolition, underwent a major restoration led by conservation architects Latham & Company, with British artist Brian Clarke commissioned to contribute to the refurbishment; his scheme, designed in 1984 and completed in 1987, was for a modern stained-glass artwork to enclose the former baths, creating an atrial space for the Cavendish Arcade, a complex of covered, independent shops. At the time of its creation the largest stained-glass window in Britain, the landmark barrel-vaulted ceiling echoes the shape of the Crescent and adjacent Colonnade, a row of shops with a projecting canopy also by Currey. Across the forecourt of the Crescent, at the foot of The Slopes, are Currey's 1894 Pump Room; and the adjacent public drinking spout St Ann's Well, built c.1940, the site of earlier wells dating back to the Roman period.

Original construction and use
The Crescent was built for William Cavendish, the 5th Duke of Devonshire, as part of his scheme to establish Buxton as a fashionable Georgian spa town. The facade forms an arc of a circle facing south-east. It was built as a unified structure incorporating a hotel, five lodging houses, and a grand assembly room with a fine painted ceiling. The Assembly Rooms became the social heart of 18th-century Buxton. 

On the ground floor arcade were shops (including a hair and wig-dresser) and kitchens were in the basement. The Great Stables were built in the 1780s (also designed by John Carr for the 5th Duke of Devonshire) to stable up to 120 horses of the guests of the Crescent. A huge central dome was later added and the building is now known as the Devonshire Dome.

Subsequent history
Over time, St. Ann's Hotel at the western end of the Crescent, and the Great Hotel, incorporating the Assembly Rooms at the eastern end, took over the intervening lodging houses in the centre of the building.

Twentieth century
The western end served as a hotel. The eastern end served as council offices, a library and a clinic. The hotel at the western end closed in the mid-1980s due to the high cost of necessary repairs. The whole building was closed when major structural problems were discovered in the assembly rooms, and by 1992 lay empty. The hotel part was bought by the local council in 1993, at which time the whole building fell into public ownership.

Restoration and re-opening
In 1993 with a grant from the National Heritage Memorial Fund the High Peak Borough Council purchased the Crescent to act as a temporary caretaker of the building until a suitable buyer could be found. A further £1.5 million from English Heritage was used to make the building weathertight.

The Crescent, Pump Rooms and Natural Baths buildings were then jointly marketed by the borough and county councils. In 1994 the Monumental Trust proposed a scheme to convert the Crescent into flats; however, no funding was found. In December 2000 the combined councils applied to the Heritage Lottery Fund to help finance plans to restore the Crescent as a hotel and to build new spa facilities. Funding was approved in July 2003.

Work to restore, redevelop and manage the hotel and spa was put out to tender, which was won in December 2003 by a partnership of the Trevor Osborne Property Group Limited and CP Holdings Limited, the parent company of the spa hotel specialists Danubius hotels. The then £23 million plan was scheduled for completion in 2007.

The project suffered a series of delays, including funding and technical and legal issues relating to the continued supply of water from springs beneath the buildings to Nestlé, the bottler of Buxton Water, and it was not until April 2012 that an agreement between the joint councils and the developer to start the first phase of the project could be signed. Phase one work on the then £35 million project for a 79-bedroom 5-star hotel, natural baths, a visitor interpretation centre, a thermal mineral water spa and specialist shops commenced in the summer of 2012. Funding problems delayed the main part of project further, but with a loan guarantee from Derbyshire County Council of £11.4 million and an additional grant of £11.3 million from the Heritage Lottery Fund announced in 2014, work resumed in 2015. In October 2018, with the project still incomplete, Derbyshire County Council agreed to invest a further £5.7 million, with the total project cost rising to £68.4 million. The total funds provided by DCC to the project are around £13.5 million.

In 2019 it was announced that the hotel would be opening in May 2020 under the Ensana brand; however, works to prepare the hotel for opening were further delayed during the 2020 COVID-19 pandemic in the United Kingdom. In October 2020 Ensana reopened the hotel following the 17 years-long refurbishment.

See also
Grade I listed buildings in Derbyshire
Listed buildings in Buxton

References

External links
High Peak Council Press Release
Article with picture of Assembly Room ceiling Visit Buxton
Article with Image of Buxton Crescent in 1795 Royal Institute of British Architects
Newsletter of the regeneration project Buxton Crescent Hotel & Thermal Spa
Articles with photo galleries of CrescentCrescent HotelsPump Room iPeak

Residential buildings completed in 1789
Grade I listed buildings in Derbyshire
Grade I listed houses
Houses in Derbyshire
Crescent
Crescents (architecture)
1789 establishments in England